The Great Canadian Maple Syrup Heist was the theft over several months in 2011 and 2012 of nearly  of maple syrup, valued at C$18.7 million from a storage facility in Quebec. The facility was operated by the Federation of Quebec Maple Syrup Producers who represent 77 percent of the global maple syrup supply. Adjusted for inflation (2020), the heist is the most valuable in Canadian history.

Origins

In 1966, a group of maple syrup producers in Quebec participated in a joint plan to collectively market maple syrup. This effort inspired the formation of a larger agreement all across Quebec which became known as the Federation of Quebec Maple Syrup Producers.

The FPAQ maintains a strategic reserve of maple syrup, officially known as the International Strategic Reserve (ISR) across multiple warehouses in rural Quebec towns.

Theft
Over the course of several months between 2011 and 2012, the contents of 9,571 barrels, valued at C$18.7M, were stolen in a suspected insider job from a FPAQ facility in Saint-Louis-de-Blandford, Quebec. The syrup was stored in unmarked white metal barrels inspected only once a year. Thieves used trucks to transport barrels to a remote sugar shack, where they siphoned off the maple syrup, refilled the barrels with water, then returned them to the facility. As the operation progressed, the thieves started siphoning syrup directly off barrels in the reserve without refilling them. The stolen syrup was trucked to the south (Vermont) and east (New Brunswick), where it was trafficked in many small batches to reduce suspicion. It was typically sold to legitimate syrup distributors who were unaware of its origin.

Discovery and investigation
In July 2012, the FPAQ took its annual inventory of syrup barrels. Inspector Michel Gauvreau started climbing up the barrels and nearly fell, expecting  barrels but finding them to be empty. Police later recovered hundreds of barrels of the syrup from an exporter based in Kedgwick, New Brunswick.

Between 18 and 20 December 2012, police arrested 17 men related to the theft.

Perpetrators
 Richard Vallières (b. 1978), accused ringleader, sentenced in April 2017 to eight years in prison plus a C$9.4 million fine, with an extension to fourteen years if the fine is not paid. Later the Quebec Court of Appeal ruled that was excessive and lowered the fine to $1 million. The Supreme Court has since reversed that decision and reinstated the original fine.
 Raymond Vallières (b. 1954), father of Richard, convicted of possession and was sentenced to two years in jail minus one day, followed by 3 years of probation.
 Étienne St-Pierre (b. 1943), a New Brunswick-based syrup reseller, was sentenced to two years in jail minus one day, 3 years of probation and an $850,000+ fine. 
 Avik Caron (b. 1974), the insider whose spouse owned the FPAQ warehouse, sentenced to five years in prison plus a C$1.2 million fine.
 Sébastien Jutras, a trucker involved in the transport of stolen syrup, served eight months in prison.

In popular culture
The theft was featured in the Netflix documentary series Dirty Money in season 1, episode 5, "The Maple Syrup Heist". 

In 2022, Amazon announced it was developing The Sticky, a half-hour comedy series based on the heist.

References

2011 in Quebec
Crime in Quebec
Individual thefts
Food theft
2012 in Quebec
2011 crimes in Canada
2012 crimes in Canada